Sechelt Inlets Marine Provincial Park is a provincial park in British Columbia, Canada, at various locations on Sechelt Inlet, Salmon Inlet and Narrows Inlet, near Sechelt (Salmon Inlet and Narrows Inlet are side arms of Sechelt Inlet).

Individual sites within the park are:
Halfway Beach site, W side Sechelt Inlet 
Thornhill Creek site; S side Salmon Inlet 
Kunechin Point site, junction of Sechelt and Salmon Inlets, on N side 
Tzoonie Narrows site, Narrows Inlet 
Piper Point site, W side Sechelt Inlet  
Skaiakos Point site, W side Sechelt Inlet

See also
Mount Richardson Provincial Park
Skookumchuck Narrows Provincial Park
List of British Columbia provincial parks

References
BC Parks infopage

Provincial parks of British Columbia
Sunshine Coast (British Columbia)
Protected areas established in 1980
1980 establishments in British Columbia
Marine parks of Canada